Tjanefer (fl.  1008 BCE) was an ancient Egyptian priest during the reign of the Twenty-first Dynasty of Egypt.

Description
His father was Nesipaherenmut, the Fourth Prophet of Amun, and his mother was Isetemheb. According to the Karnak Priestly Annals, Tjanefer served as the Fourth Prophet of Amun in the 40th regnal year of Psusennes I ( 1008 BCE). He was later promoted to Third Prophet, as it is mentioned in a papyrus found in his tomb at Bab el-Gasus (today in the Egyptian Museum in Cairo).

He married Gautseshen, the daughter of High Priest Menkheperre and Princess Isetemkheb. They had two sons, Pinedjem, later Fourth Prophet, and Menkheperre, Third Prophet of Amun.

References

Further reading
 Claude Traunecker, Les residents des rives du Lac Sacré, Le cas d'Ankhefenkhonsou, CRIPEL 15 (1993), 83-93.  
 Gerard P.F. Broekman, On the Chronology and Genealogy of the Second, Third and Fourth Prophets of Amun in Thebes during the Twenty-First Dynasty in Egypt, GM 174 (2000), 25-36.

Prophets of Amun
People of the Twenty-first Dynasty of Egypt